Carlisle Franciscan Friary was a medieval monastic house in Cumbria, England.

References

Monasteries in Cumbria